Doʻstobod, until 1991 Soldatskiy is a city in Tashkent Region, Uzbekistan. It is the capital of Quyichirchiq District. Its population was 13,600 in 2000, and 16,200 in 2016.

References

Populated places in Tashkent Region
Cities in Uzbekistan